The 2016 FC Dallas season was the club's 21st season in existence in Major League Soccer (MLS), the top tier of the United States soccer league system. The club played its home games at Toyota Stadium for the 12th straight year.

The 2016 season was FC Dallas' most successful season ever. They achieved the double by winning both the Supporters' Shield for posting the best regular season record and the U.S. Open Cup, the nation's domestic cup competition. It marked the first time since 2014 where a club earned the double. The Hoops fell short of winning the treble by being eliminated in the conference semifinals of the 2016 MLS Cup Playoffs, losing 2–4 on aggregate to the Seattle Sounders FC. Individually, head coach Óscar Pareja was named MLS Coach of the Year, Matt Hedges was named Defender of the Year, and Mauro Díaz and Hedges were named to the MLS Best XI.

In addition to winning the Shield, winning the Open Cup and participating in the MLS Cup Playoffs, Dallas also played in the group stages of the 2016–17 CONCACAF Champions League, where they managed to win their group. This allowed Dallas to qualify for the knockout rounds of a CONCACAF competition for the first time in their club history. The knockout rounds of the competition will be played during the 2017 FC Dallas season.

Background

Transfers

In

Out

Loan in

Loan out

2015 MLS Re-Entry Draft picks 

The first stage of the 2015 MLS Re-Entry Draft took place on December 11, 2015.
The second stage of the 2015 MLS Re-Entry Draft took place on December 17, 2015.

2016 MLS SuperDraft picks 

Rounds 1 and 2 of the draft were held on January 14, 2016. 
Rounds 3 and 4 of the draft were held on January 19, 2016.

Roster 
As of September 15, 2016.

Competitions

Match results

Preseason

Major League Soccer

League table

Western Conference standings 
Western Conference

Overall standings

Results summary

Results by round

Regular season 
Kickoff times are in CDT (UTC-05) unless shown otherwise

MLS Cup Playoffs

Western Conference Semifinals

CONCACAF Champions League 

Since FC Dallas were the 2015 MLS Western Conference regular season champions, the club qualified for a group stage spot in the CONCACAF Champions League.  It is the second time Dallas qualified for the competition after participating in the group stage of the 2011-12 Champions League where they did not advance out of the group stage. This time, however, they won their group to advance to the knockout stage.

Group stage

U.S. Open Cup

Statistics

Appearances 

Numbers outside parentheses denote appearances as starter.
Numbers in parentheses denote appearances as substitute.
Players with no appearances are not included in the list.

''

Goals and assists

Disciplinary record

Goalkeeper statistics

Kits

See also 
 FC Dallas
 2016 in American soccer
 2016 Major League Soccer season

References 

FC Dallas seasons
FC Dallas
FC Dallas
FC Dallas
2016
2016